Giunta is an Italian surname. Notable people with the surname include:

Ana María Giunta (1943– 2015), Argentine actress
Andrea Giunta (born 1960), Argentine art historian, professor, researcher, and curator
Blas Giunta (born 1963), Argentine footballer and manager
Edvige Giunta (born 1959), Sicilian-American author and educator
Francesco Giunta (1887–1971), Italian Fascist politician
Giulio Giunta (born 1935), Italian modern pentathlete
John Giunta (c. 192-1970), illustrator of comic books from the 1940s through the 1960s
Joseph Giunta (mobster) (1887-1929),  Italian-American mobster with the Chicago Outfit
Giunta Pisano (fl. 1202–1258, Italian painter
Giuseppe Giunta (born 1973), Italian wrestler 
Joseph Giunta (1911–2001), Canadian painter
Lucantonio Giunti (or Giunta; 1457–1538), Florentine book publisher and printer, active in Venice from 1489
Peter Giunta (born 1956), American football coach 
Salvatore Giunta (born 1985), American Medal of Honor recipient
Salvatore Giunta (footballer) (born 1967), Italian footballer

Fictional
Furio Giunta, played by Federico Castelluccio, a fictional character on the HBO TV series The Sopranos

See also
Giunti (printers), Florentine family of printers, also spelled Giunta

Italian-language surnames